Lise Cutter (born July 31, 1959) is an American actress who is known for her roles as Susan Campbell on Perfect Strangers, and as Gina McKay on Dangerous Curves.

Filmography

Film

Television

External links
 

1959 births
Living people
American film actresses
American television actresses
People from Palmdale, California
Actresses from California
21st-century American women